USS Kerwood (ID-1489) was a cargo ship that served in the United States Navy from 1918-1919.

Kerwood was built as the merchant ship SS Budapest at Thornaby-on-Tees, England, by Richardson, Duck and Company. She was later renamed SS Kerwood. The U.S. Navy acquired Kerwood for World War I service on 5 November 1918, assigned her the naval registry Identification Number (Id. No.) 1489, and commissioned her the same day as USS Kerwood.

Assigned to the Naval Overseas Transportation Service, Kerwood commenced coaling runs from Cardiff, Wales, to French ports. She continued these operations until 28 December 1918, when she arrived at Bordeaux, France with 1,000 tons of United States Army stores. From Bordeaux, she proceeded to Cardiff before departing for the U.S. on 29 January 1919. She arrived at Norfolk, Virginia on 27 February.

Kerwood was decommissioned on 19 March and transferred to the United States Shipping Board for simultaneous return to her owner.

Once again SS Kerwood, the ship returned to commercial service. The transport Edilyn arrived in New York Harbor on 1 January 1920 with 25 members of the Kerwood crew aboard.

Notes

References

External links
NavSource Online: Section Patrol Craft Photo Archive: Kerwood (ID 1489)

World War I cargo ships of the United States
Ships built on the River Tees
1911 ships
Shipwrecks in the North Sea
Cargo ships of the United States Navy
Maritime incidents in 1919
Ships sunk by mines